Pangin is a town in Siang district, for which it is the headquarters. Prior to the creation of the Siang district in 2015, the town had been in East Siang district.

The settlement is at the junction point where Siyom River meets the Siang River. It is the home of the Adi people of Arunachal Pradesh.

 the name of current MLA of Pangin constituency is Tapang Taloh.

References 

Siang district
Cities and towns in Siang district